Oocephala stenocephala is a plant in the family Asteraceae, native to tropical Africa.

Description
The capitula feature blue, white or purple flowers. The fruits are achenes.

Distribution and habitat
Oocephala stenocephala is native to an area of Africa from Nigeria southeast to Mozambique.

References

stenocephala
Flora of Africa
Plants described in 1881